Julian Arthur Ellingboe (8 March 1892 –  23 April 1948) was an American racecar driver. Despite competing in six Indianapolis 500 races, he competed in few other Championship Car events, just a handful of board track events in 1922 and 1923.

Biography
He was born on March 8, 1892, in Crookston, Minnesota. He died on April 23, 1948, in  Creswell, Oregon.

Indianapolis 500 results

References

External links

1892 births
1948 deaths
People from Crookston, Minnesota
Indianapolis 500 drivers
Racing drivers from Minnesota